Vahram Atanesyan is a journalist and legislator from Nagorno-Karabakh.
He is the chair of the legislature's standing committee on Foreign Affairs.

References 

Atanesyan, Vahram